Cleofonte Campanini (1 September 1860 – 19 December 1919) was an Italian conductor.  His brother was the tenor Italo Campanini.

Biography
Born in Parma, Italy on 1 September 1860, Campanini studied music at that city's conservatory, making his debut with a performance of Carmen, also in Parma, in 1883.  That year he was invited to New York City during the inaugural season of the Metropolitan Opera, and was offered a position as assistant conductor with the company.  Five years later he returned to the United States to lead the American premiere of Giuseppe Verdi's Otello at the Academy of Music.  Desdemona was sung by Eva Tetrazzini, who Campanini had married in 1887.

He conducted at the  Teatro Nacional de São Carlos, Lisbon, between 1888 and 1903 where he conducted, among others, the premieres of Augusto Machado's Mario Wetter (1898) and Alfredo Keil's Serrana (1899) (considered the best Portuguese opera) with Eva Tetrazzini in the leading roles. Campanini conducted at La Scala for three years, where he conducted the premiere of Puccini's Madama Butterfly in 1904.  In 1906 he was appointed artistic director of the newly formed Manhattan Opera Company.  He stayed there for three years before resigning over artistic disagreements with the company's manager, Oscar Hammerstein I.  In 1910 he became the first conductor of the Chicago Grand Opera Company at the Auditorium Theatre, remaining there until his death; he brought the company with him in 1918 to New York for a four-week season that included Amelita Galli-Curci's first appearance in the city. He was initiated as an honorary member of Phi Mu Alpha Sinfonia fraternity in 1917.  From 1915 to his death in 1919, Campanini was artistic director and principal conductor of the Chicago Opera Association.

Campanini was known for his association with French opera, and introduced numerous works to the United States; these included Hérodiade, I gioielli della Madonna, Louise, Pelléas et Mélisande, Monna Vanna, Jules Massenet's Sapho and Thaïs.

Campanini died at St. Luke's Hospital in Chicago, Illinois on 19 December 1919 of pneumonia.

References

Further reading
Francisco Fonseca Benevides, "O Real Thetro de S. Carlos de Lisboa 1883 -1902". Lisbon; Typographia e Lithografia de Ricardo Souza & Salles, 1902
David Ewen, Encyclopedia of the Opera: New Enlarged Edition.  New York; Hill and Wang, 1963.

External links

1860 births
1919 deaths
Musicians from Parma
Italian male conductors (music)
19th-century Italian musicians
19th-century conductors (music)
20th-century Italian male musicians
20th-century Italian conductors (music)
Italian expatriates in the United States
Deaths from pneumonia in Illinois